First Liberty Institute is a nonprofit Christian conservative legal organization based in Plano, Texas.

Prominent in the legal circles on the Christian right, the organization litigates in First Amendment cases on religion, and is often referred to as a law firm.

First Liberty Institute is headed by Kelly Shackelford who founded the organization in 1997 under the name Liberty Legal Institute. The organization changed its name to Liberty Institute in 2009 and then, in 2016, to First Liberty Institute.

Prominent cases
First Liberty Institute is one of several Christian conservative legal organizations in the United States; others include the Alliance Defending Freedom, American Center for Law and Justice, Thomas More Society, Freedom of Conscience Defense Fund, Liberty Counsel, National Legal Foundation, Christian Legal Society, and Becket Fund for Religious Liberty. The group has taken stances against LGBT rights. Among its most prominent cases are the "Candy Cane Case"; legal actions taken to stop a report on an investigation into Sarah Palin being published; and numerous legal cases filed in Texas courts concerning First Amendment and religious freedom issues.

List of Supreme Court cases:

 Sause v. Bauer, 
 American Legion v. American Humanist Association, 
 Roman Catholic Archdiocese of San Juan v. Acevedo Feliciano, 
 Carson v. Makin, 
 Kennedy v. Bremerton School District, 

Coach Joe Kennedy

First Liberty Institute represented high school football coach Joseph A. Kennedy in a lawsuit against the Bremerton School District in the state of Washington. The dispute centers around the dismissal of the coach after a school policy conflict pertaining to his practice of a prayer after each game. The Supreme Court declined to hear the case in January 2019. In March 2020, a federal district court ruled against Kennedy. In January 2022, the Supreme Court agreed to hear the case. In April 2022, the Supreme Court heard oral argument in the case. In June 2022, the Supreme Court ruled in favor of the coach. In a 6-3 ruling, the Court held that the school district discriminated against Coach Kennedy and that his prayers are protected by the Constitution's guarantees of free speech and religious exercise.

Maine Tuition Program

First Liberty, alongside the Institute for Justice, represented three families in the Supreme Court case Carson v. Makin. The case centered around the limits of school vouchers offered by state governments to pay for religious-based private schools.
A Maine law excluded religious schools from a state tuition program, which pays for students to attend private schools. In December 2021, the Supreme Court heard oral argument in the case. In June 2022, the Supreme Court ruled 6–3 in favor of the three families, holding that Maine's exclusion of religious schools from otherwise generally available tuition assistance programs violated the Free Exercise Clause. The case was remanded to a lower court for further proceedings.

Oregon Cake Bakers, Aaron and Melissa Klein

First Liberty represents Aaron and Melissa Klein, who owned a family bakery in Oregon, Sweet Cakes by Melissa. In 2013, they declined to design and create a custom wedding cake to celebrate a same-sex wedding because doing so would violate their religious beliefs. In 2015, the Oregon Bureau of Labor and Industries found the couple had violated the state's nondiscrimination statutes and ordered them to pay $135,000 in compensatory damages. That decision was reaffirmed by a ruling from the Oregon Court of Appeals in 2017. In 2018, the case was appealed to the U.S. Supreme Court. In 2019, the U.S. Supreme Court vacated the ruling and directed the Oregon court to review its decision in the wake of Masterpiece Cakeshop, Ltd. v. Colorado Civil Rights Commission, which favored a Colorado baker who also declined to serve a same-sex couple because of his religious beliefs. In January 2022, the Oregon Court of Appeals, for a second time, held that the Kleins had illegally discriminated against the same-sex couple, but ordered the state to reconsider the monetary damages.

Veterans Memorials

First Liberty Institute has litigated veterans memorial cross cases. Among these cases was the Bladensburg WWI Veterans Memorial case, which has been in litigation since 2014, after the American Humanist Association sued to remove the memorial claiming it was in violation of the U.S. Constitution. In June 2019, the U.S. Supreme Court ruled in American Legion v. American Humanist Association upholding the cross memorial, citing that it did not violate the Establishment Clause. In previous years, the Freedom From Religion Foundation, the ACLU, and the American Humanist Association have challenged other similar veterans memorial cross cases.

Dr. Eric Walsh

First Liberty Institute represented Dr. Eric Walsh in a lawsuit against the Georgia Department of Health (DPH), which hired Walsh in 2014 as a public health director for northwest Georgia, and then fired him one week later after reviewing his Seventh-Day Adventist sermons. Walsh alleged that Georgia DPH had unlawfully discriminated against him based on religion. The state settled the case for $225,000.

Religious Expression for Military Service Members

First Liberty filed a lawsuit against the Navy and the Department of Defense on behalf of 35 Navy SEALs in November 2021. The suit alleges that the service members had faced a range of military discipline for declining to take the COVID-19 vaccine due to their religious beliefs. In January 2022, a U.S. District Judge issued a preliminary injunction, blocking the Navy and the Department of Defense from punishing the service members and enforcing the vaccine mandate. In March 2022, the Supreme Court issued an order affirming the Biden administration's authority to make deployment decisions based on vaccination status.

In May 2022, First Liberty Institute, alongside law firm Schaerr Jaffe LLP, filed a lawsuit against the Department of Defense and the Air Force on behalf of several U.S. Air Force service members. The suit alleges that the Department of Defense is violating the First Amendment by denying several service members a religious exemption to the COVID-19 vaccine mandate.

In 2011, First Liberty filed a lawsuit against the U.S. Department of Veterans Affairs alleging that the department had censored prayers and the use of the words "God" or "Jesus". The department's response was that its regulations stated that there is no censorship but that the religious preferences of the families of the deceased are respected and that at times families have complained about volunteers and the Veterans of Foreign Wars had included religious references in services even though the families had requested that there be none. The department's response said, "Defendants believe that it should be the family's choice and decision what to have read in accordance with their faith tradition, if any, because it would be improper for others to impose their own religious preferences on a Veteran’s family, especially during this meaningful event". The case was settled in September 2012 after mediation by former Texas Supreme Court Chief Justice Thomas R. Phillips.

The Candy Cane Case

The "Candy Cane Case" began in 2004, after a student in Plano, Texas, was prohibited by school officials from distributing candy canes with a religious story attached at his school's Christmas party. In 2011, the U.S. Court of Appeals for the Fifth Circuit granted two school principals immunity in the case against the Plano Independent School District. The Liberty Institute appealed the case to the U.S. Supreme Court, which refused to hear the case in 2012, upholding the decision of the U.S. Court of Appeals for the Fifth Circuit.

Prominent individuals
In November 2016, Ken Klukowski, First Liberty's senior counsel and director of strategic affairs was appointed to head the issue area of "Protecting Americans' Constitutional Rights" in the Donald Trump presidential transition team. Klukowski, later Senior Counsel to Assistant Attorney General Jeffrey Clark, was one of several Trump campaign officials subpoenaed in the Jan. 6 Select Committee investigation.

Matthew J. Kacsmaryk, who served as Deputy General Counsel to First Liberty Institute, and Jeff Mateer, who previously served as general counsel, were nominated in 2017 by President Trump for District Court positions. Mateer subsequently withdrew after a May 2015 speech where he referred to transgender children as "Satan’s plan" became public. The Senate confirmed Kacsmaryk on June 19, 2019.

References

External links
 Official website

Legal advocacy organizations in the United States
Conservative organizations in the United States
Christian organizations based in the United States
Organizations established in 1972
Law firms based in Texas
Non-profit organizations based in Texas
501(c)(3) organizations